William James Sidis (April 1, 1898 – July 17, 1944) was an American child prodigy with exceptional mathematical and linguistic skills. He is notable for his book The Animate and the Inanimate published in 1925 (written around 1920), in which he speculates about the origin of life in the context of thermodynamics.

Sidis was raised in a particular manner by his father, psychiatrist Boris Sidis, who wished his son to be gifted. Sidis first became famous for his precocity and later for his eccentricity and withdrawal from public life. Eventually, he avoided mathematics altogether, writing on other subjects under a number of pseudonyms. He entered Harvard at age 11 and, as an adult, was said to have an extremely high IQ, and to be conversant in about 25 languages and dialects. Some of these statements have not been verified, but many of his contemporaries, including Norbert Wiener, Daniel Frost Comstock and William James, agreed that he was extremely intelligent.

Biography

Parents and upbringing (1898–1908)
Sidis was born to Jewish emigrants from Ukraine, on April 1, 1898, in New York City. His father, Boris Sidis, had emigrated in 1887 to escape political and anti-semitic persecution. His mother, Sarah (Mandelbaum) Sidis, and her family had fled the pogroms in the late 1880s. Sarah attended Boston University and graduated from its School of Medicine in 1897. William was named after his godfather, Boris's friend and colleague, the American philosopher William James. Boris was a psychiatrist and published numerous books and articles, performing pioneering work in abnormal psychology. He was a polyglot, and his son William would also become one at a young age.

Sidis's parents believed in nurturing a precocious and fearless love of knowledge, although their methods of parenting were criticized in the media and retrospectively. Sidis could read The New York Times at 18 months. By age eight, he had reportedly taught himself eight languages (Latin, Greek, French, Russian, German, Hebrew, Turkish, and Armenian) and invented another, which he called "Vendergood".

Harvard University and college life (1909–1914)
Although the University had previously refused to let his father enroll him at age 9 because he was still a child, Sidis set a record in 1909 by becoming the youngest person to enroll at Harvard University. In early 1910, Sidis's mastery of higher mathematics was such that he lectured the Harvard Mathematical Club on four-dimensional bodies, attracting nationwide attention.  Notable child prodigy, cybernetics pioneer Norbert Wiener, who also attended Harvard at the time and knew Sidis, later stated in his book Ex-Prodigy: "The talk would have done credit to a first or second-year graduate student of any age...talk represented the triumph of the unaided efforts of a very brilliant child." MIT physics professor Daniel F. Comstock was full of praises: "Karl Friedrich Gauss is the only example in history, of all prodigies, whom Sidis resembles. I predict that young Sidis will be a great astronomical mathematician. He will evolve new theories and invent new ways of calculating astronomical phenomena. I believe he will be a great mathematician, the leader in that science in the future." Sidis began taking a full-time course load in 1910 and earned his Bachelor of Arts degree, cum laude, on June 18, 1914, at age 16.

Shortly after graduation, he told reporters "I want to live the perfect life. The only way to live the perfect life is to live it in seclusion". He granted an interview to a reporter from the Boston Herald. The paper reported Sidis's vows to remain celibate and never to marry, as he said women did not appeal to him. Later he developed a strong affection for Martha Foley, one year older than him. He later enrolled at Harvard Graduate School of Arts and Sciences.

Teaching and further education (1915–1919)
After a group of Harvard students threatened Sidis physically, his parents secured him a job at the William Marsh Rice Institute for the Advancement of Letters, Science, and Art (now Rice University) in Houston, Texas, as a mathematics teaching assistant. He arrived at Rice in December 1915 at the age of 17. He was a graduate fellow working toward his doctorate.

Sidis taught three classes: Euclidean geometry, non-Euclidean geometry, and freshman math (he wrote a textbook for the Euclidean geometry course in Greek). After less than a year, frustrated with the department, his teaching requirements, and his treatment by students older than himself, Sidis left his post and returned to New England. When a friend later asked him why he had left, he replied, "I never knew why they gave me the job in the first place—I'm not much of a teacher. I didn't leave: I was asked to go." Sidis abandoned his pursuit of a graduate degree in mathematics and enrolled at the Harvard Law School in September 1916, but withdrew in good standing in his final year in March 1919.

Politics and arrest (1919–1921)
In 1919, shortly after his withdrawal from law school, Sidis was arrested for participating in a socialist May Day parade in Boston that turned violent. He was sentenced to 18 months in prison under the Sedition Act of 1918 by Roxbury Municipal Court Judge Albert F Hayden. Sidis's arrest featured prominently in newspapers, as his early graduation from Harvard had garnered considerable local celebrity status. During the trial, Sidis stated that he had been a conscientious objector to the World War I draft, was a socialist, and did not believe in a god like the "big boss of the Christians," but rather in something that is in a way apart from a human being. He later developed his own libertarian philosophy based on individual rights and "the American social continuity". His father arranged with the district attorney to keep Sidis out of prison before his appeal came to trial; his parents, instead, held him in their sanatorium in New Hampshire for a year. They took him to California, where he spent another year. At the sanatorium, his parents set about "reforming" him and threatened him with transfer to an insane asylum.

Later life (1921–1944)
After returning to the East Coast in 1921, Sidis was determined to live an independent and private life. He only took work running adding machines or other fairly menial tasks. He worked in New York City and became estranged from his parents. It took years before he was cleared legally to return to Massachusetts, and he was concerned for years about his risk of arrest. He obsessively collected streetcar transfers, wrote self-published periodicals, and taught small circles of interested friends his version of American history. In 1933, Sidis passed a Civil Service exam in New York, but scored a low ranking of 254. In a private letter, Sidis wrote that this was "not so encouraging". In 1935, he wrote an unpublished manuscript, The Tribes and the States, which traces Native American contributions to American democracy.

In 1944, Sidis won a settlement from The New Yorker for an article published in 1937. He had alleged it contained many false statements. Under the title "Where Are They Now?", James Thurber pseudonymously described Sidis's life as lonely, in a "hall bedroom in Boston's shabby South End". Lower courts had dismissed Sidis as a public figure with no right to challenge personal publicity. He lost an appeal of an invasion of privacy lawsuit at the United States Court of Appeals for the Second Circuit in 1940 over the same article. Judge Charles Edward Clark expressed sympathy for Sidis, who claimed that the publication had exposed him to "public scorn, ridicule, and contempt" and caused him "grievous mental anguish [and] humiliation," but found that the court was not disposed to "afford to all the intimate details of private life an absolute immunity from the prying of the press".

Sidis died from a cerebral hemorrhage in 1944 in Boston at age 46.

Publications and subjects of research
From writings on cosmology, to writings on Native American history, to Notes on the Collection of Transfers, and several purported lost texts on anthropology, philology, and transportation systems, Sidis covered a broad range of subjects. Some of his ideas concerned cosmological reversibility and "social continuity".

In The Animate and the Inanimate (1925), Sidis predicted the existence of regions of space where the second law of thermodynamics operated in reverse to the temporal direction that we experience in our local area. Everything outside of what we would today call a galaxy would be such a region. Sidis said that the matter in this region would not generate light. Sidis's The Tribes and the States (c. 1935) employs the pseudonym "John W. Shattuck", purporting to give a 100,000-year history of the Settlement of the Americas, from prehistoric times to 1828. In this text, he suggests that "there were red men at one time in Europe as well as in America".

Sidis was also a "peridromophile", a term he coined for people fascinated with transportation research and streetcar systems. He wrote a treatise on streetcar transfers under the pseudonym of "Frank Folupa" that identified means of increasing public transport usage. For this work, in 1926 he was invited to speak at the inaugural "genius meeting" hosted by Winifred Sackville Stoner's League for Fostering Genius in Tuckahoe, New York.

In 1930, Sidis received a patent for a rotary perpetual calendar that took into account leap years.

The Animate and the Inanimate
Sidis wrote The Animate and the Inanimate to detail his thoughts on the origins of life, cosmology, and the potential reversibility of the second law of thermodynamics through Maxwell's Demon, among other things. It was published in 1925; however, it has been suggested that Sidis was working on the theory as early as 1916. One motivation for writing this theory appears to be to explain psychologist and philosopher William James's "reserve energy" theory which said that there was "reserve energy" that could be used by people when put under extreme conditions, Sidis's own "forced prodigy" upbringing being a result of testing said theory. The work is one of the few works that Sidis did not write under a pseudonym.

In The Animate and the Inanimate, Sidis states that the universe is infinite, as well as it containing sections of "negative tendencies" where various laws of physics were reversed that are juxtaposed with "positive tendencies", which switch over epochs of time. Sidis states that there was not an "origin of life", but that life has always existed and that it has only changed through evolution. Sidis also adopts Eduard Pflüger's cyanogen based life theory, and Sidis cites "organic" things such as almonds (his example) that have cyanogen that doesn't kill, as cyanogen (and derivatives thereof) is normally a highly toxic substance thus making this a strange anomaly. Sidis describes his theory as a fusion of the mechanistic model of life and the vitalist model of life, as well as entertaining the notion of life coming to earth from asteroids (as advanced by Lord Kelvin and Hermann von Helmholtz). Sidis also states that functionally speaking, stars are "alive" and undergo an eternally repeating light-dark cycle, reversing the second law in the dark portion of the cycle.

Sidis's theory at the time of its release was ignored, only to be found in an attic in 1979. Upon this discovery, Buckminster Fuller (who was a classmate of William James Sidis) said the following about The Animate and the Inanimate:

Vendergood language
Sidis created a constructed language called Vendergood in his second book, the Book of Vendergood, which he wrote at the age of 8. The language was mostly based on Latin and Greek, but also drew on German and French and other Romance languages. It distinguished between eight moods: indicative, potential, imperative absolute, subjunctive, imperative, infinitive, optative, and Sidis's own . One of its chapters is titled "Imperfect and Future Indicative Active". Other parts explain the origin of Roman numerals. It uses base 12 instead of base 10:
  – 'one'
  – 'two'
  – 'three'
  – 'four'
  – 'five'
  – 'six'
  – 'seven'
  – 'eight'
  – 'nine'
  – 'ten'
  – 'eleven'
  – 'twelve'
  – 'thirteen'

Most of the examples are presented in the form of tests:

 'Do I love the young man?' = 
 'The bowman obscures.' = 
 'I am learning Vendergood.' = 
 'What do you learn?' (sing.). = 
 'I obscure ten farmers.' =

The Tribes and the States
The Tribes and the States outlines the history of the Native Americans, focusing mostly on the Northeastern tribes and continuing up to the mid-19th century. It was written around 1935 but was never published for lack of completion at the time of Sidis's death. Sidis wrote the history under the pseudonym "John W. Shattuck". Much of the history was taken from wampum belts; Sidis explained, "The weaving of wampum belts is a sort of writing by means of belts of colored beads, in which the various designs of beads denoted different ideas according to a definitely accepted system, which could be read by anyone acquainted with wampum language, irrespective of what the spoken language is. Records and treaties are kept in this manner, and individuals could write letters to one another in this way."

Much of the subject matter of the book is centered on the influence of Native Americans on migrating Europeans and the effect of Native Americans on the formation of the United States.  It describes the origination of the federations that were to be an important event to the Founding Fathers.

Legacy
After his death, Helena Sidis said that her brother had an IQ reported in Abraham Sperling's 1946 book Psychology for the Millions as "the very highest that had ever been obtained", but later authors found that some of his biographers, such as Amy Wallace, exaggerated how high his IQ actually was. Sperling actually wrote:

It has been acknowledged that Helena and William's mother Sarah had developed a reputation of exaggerated statements about the Sidis family. Helena had also falsely stated that the Civil Service exam William took in 1933 was an IQ test and that his ranking of 254 was instead an IQ score of 254. It is speculated that the number "254" was actually William's placement on the list after he passed the Civil Service exam, as he stated in a letter sent to his family. Helena also said that "Billy knew all the languages in the world, while my father only knew 27. I wonder if there were any Billy didn't know." This statement was not backed by any other source outside the Sidis family, and Sarah Sidis also made an improbable statement in her 1950 book The Sidis Story that William could learn a language in just one day. Boris Sidis had once dismissed tests of intelligence as "silly, pedantic, absurd, and grossly misleading". Regardless of the exaggerations, Sidis was judged by contemporaries such as MIT Physics professor Daniel Frost Comstock and American mathematician Norbert Wiener (who wrote about Sidis in his autobiography) to have had real ability.

Sidis's life and work, particularly his ideas about Native Americans, are extensively discussed in Robert M. Pirsig's book Lila: An Inquiry into Morals (1991). Sidis is also discussed in Ex-Prodigy, an autobiography by mathematician Norbert Wiener (1894–1964), who was a prodigy himself.

The Danish author  wrote a novel as a fictional account based on Sidis's life; The Perfect Life of William Sidis was published in Denmark in 2011. Another novel based on his biography was published by the German author  in 2017.

In education discussions
The debate about Sidis's manner of upbringing occurred within a larger discourse about the best way to educate children. Newspapers criticized Boris Sidis's child-rearing methods. Most educators of the day believed that schools should expose children to common experiences to create good citizens. Most psychologists thought intelligence was hereditary, a position that precluded early childhood education at home.

The difficulties Sidis encountered in dealing with the social structure of a collegiate setting may have shaped opinion against allowing such children to rapidly advance through higher education in his day. Research indicates that a challenging curriculum can relieve social and emotional difficulties commonly experienced by gifted children. Embracing these findings, several colleges now have procedures for early entrance. The Davidson Institute for Talent Development has developed a guidebook on the topic.

Sidis was portrayed derisively in the press of the day. The New York Times, for example, described him as "a wonderfully successful result of a scientific forcing experiment". His mother later maintained that newspaper accounts of her son bore little resemblance to him.

Bibliography
 The Animate and the Inanimate (1925)
 The Tribes and the States (PDF file)

References

Sources

External links

 Sidis Archives at Sidis.net
 Article about William James Sidis at "The Straight Dope"

1898 births
1944 deaths
20th-century American historians
American male non-fiction writers
20th-century American mathematicians
American anti-war activists
American conscientious objectors
American inventors
American libertarians
American pacifists
American people of Russian-Jewish descent
American people of Ukrainian-Jewish descent
American socialists
American spiritualists
Harvard Law School alumni
Jewish American writers
Rice University alumni
Rice University faculty
Jewish American atheists
Left-libertarians
20th-century American anthropologists
20th-century American male writers
Harvard College alumni
Pseudonymous writers